Aero Spacelines, Inc. was an American aircraft manufacturer from 1960 to 1968 that converted Boeing 377 Stratocruisers into the famous Guppy line of airplanes, re-engineered to transport oversized cargo such as space exploration vehicles.

History 
Aero Spacelines was formed with only one customer in mind: the National Aeronautics and Space Administration. NASA needed to transport outsize cargo from manufacturing plants such as the Michoud Assembly Facility in New Orleans, Louisiana, to Cape Canaveral Air Force Station in Florida. These items were too large to be safely transported by rail or truck. Shipping by sea was time-consuming, expensive, and risky, with the danger of damaging the cargo on turbulent seas. But no aircraft of the day was large enough.

John M. "Jack" Conroy, a retired United States Air Force pilot, and Lee Mansdorf, an aircraft salesman and entrepreneur, formulated the Guppy concept one evening over dinner. They decided to create a company to manufacture outsized aircraft. Conroy hired Robert W. Lillibridge as vice president of manufacturing and engineering, and a team was assembled for the project. Financing was provided by venture capitalist William Ballon, a World War II combat veteran also from the Army Air Corps. In 1960, Aero Spacelines began working at Van Nuys Airport, California, to transform a Boeing 377 airliner into the Pregnant Guppy.

NASA's Project Gemini made early use of the Pregnant Guppy to transport the first and second stages of Titan II GVL from the Martin Co. in Baltimore, Maryland, to Cape Canaveral, Florida. Subsequent versions of the Guppy series hauled the S-IVB, the third stage of the Saturn booster from California to Florida.

In 1967, Aero Spacelines encountered financial difficulties and was acquired by Unexcelled Inc. That corporation was sold to Tracor Aviation. Conroy organized a new company, Conroy Aircraft, which built more airplanes for transporting oversized cargo. By November 1968, NASA had paid Aero Spacelines $11,591,633 in contracts. Conroy ceased operations in 1972.

As of March 2021, one Super Guppy was still in operation. NASA uses it to transport vehicles, and leases it to third parties when not in use.

In early 2016, NASA used that aircraft to transport the main structure of Orion crew capsule, from its Michoud Manufacturing Facility in New Orleans, Louisiana, to the Kennedy Space Center in Florida, where the capsule underwent its first uncrewed test flight aboard the Space Launch System rocket.  In November 2019, NASA used the aircraft to transport the Orion capsule from the Kennedy Space Center to the Mansfield Lahm Airport in Ohio for thermal and vacuum tests.

List of aircraft
Aero Spacelines produced three Guppy aircraft models.
Pregnant Guppy (1962) - 1 built
Super Guppy (1965) - 5 built
Mini Guppy (1967) - 2 built

See also
Airbus Beluga
Boeing Dreamlifter
Conroy Skymonster

References

External links
 Pregnant Guppy : THE PLANE THAT WON THE SPACE RACE Bloom, Margy. May / June 2010, PILOTMAG Magazine
It's a Plane: One man's obsession, it helped get us to the moon Tripp, Robert S. Spring 2002, American Heritage of Invention and Technology
Page about Airbus Industrie's Beluga
Site about The Guppy Family of Aircraft
NASA.gov
 The Day the Super Guppy Blew Her Top 

Defunct aircraft manufacturers of the United States